Humble Lions Football Club is a Jamaican professional football club based in May Pen, which plays in the Jamaica National Premier League, the top flight of Jamaican Football.

Club name
Though their club crest calls them Humble Lions F.C., they are often referred to by the Singular Humble Lion F.C.

History
Founded in 1974 as a team of Rastafarians, Humble Lions was promoted to the Jamaica National Premier League for the first time at the end of the 2008/2009 season, making their debut in Jamaica's major football top-flight.

They finished both of their first two seasons in the top tier just above the relegation zone but spent big in summer 2011 when looking for a promising start of the 2011/2012 season.
Humble lion has seen notable coaches such as Lenworth Hyde, Donovan Duckie, and Vassell Reynolds.
Their president is a Jamaican politician Mike Henry.

Ground
The team is based in Effortville, a part of May Pen in central Clarendon, with their home ground at the Effortville Mini Stadium.

Honours
South Central Confederation Super League: 1
2009

References

 Football clubs in Jamaica
Association football clubs established in 1974
1974 establishments in Jamaica